Dan Hunt (born 8 September 1986 in Sydney, New South Wales) is an Australian former professional rugby league footballer who played for the St. George Illawarra Dragons in the National Rugby League competition.

Playing career
Hunt made his first grade debut in Round 1 of 2007 against the Gold Coast Titans

In 2010, Hunt was unfortunate to not play a part in the 2010 NRL Premiership due to an Achilles tendon injury sustained in the warmup of the round 11 match against the Canberra Raiders at WIN Stadium.

On 8 February 2011, it was confirmed that Hunt had agreed to a contract extension that would keep him at the St. George Illawarra Dragons until the end of 2013.

On 29 July 2015, Hunt announced his retirement from rugby league due to injury.

References

External links
 St. George Illawarra Dragons Profile
 NRL Player Profile
 Daily Telegraph Player Profile

1986 births
Living people
Australian rugby league players
Country New South Wales Origin rugby league team players
Prime Minister's XIII players
Rugby league props
St. George Illawarra Dragons players